The Lawful and the Prohibited in Islam is a book by Islamic scholar Yusuf al-Qaradawi, originally published in 1960 under the Arabic title  Al-Halal Wal-Haram Fil-Islam. Some translations into English of the work include those published by:  
Ahl-al-bait, with annotations and commentary  by Allamah Shaikh Hasan Muhammad Taqi al-Jawahiri.  
American Trust Publications published January 30, 1999. 
El Falah, in 1997.
 Islamic Book Trust, Malaysia.

The book was briefly banned in France in 1995, following a government order on 24 April 1995, before the ban was repealed several weeks later on 9 May 1995.

See also
List of Sunni books

References

Sunni literature